David Goldschmid (sometimes credited as Dave Goldschmid) is an American television writer and producer, currently writing for the daytime drama General Hospital.

Personal life
He was raised in Los Angeles, California, where he currently resides.

Positions held
At ABC's General Hospital
 Staff Writer: October 17, 2005 – present
 Occasional Breakdown Writer: April 28, 2005 - October 16, 2005

Awards and nominations
Daytime Emmy Award
 Won: 2009
 Nominated: 2007, 2008
Writers Guild of America Award
 Won: 2012
 Nominated: 2007, 2011

References

External links
 

American soap opera writers
American male screenwriters
Year of birth missing (living people)
Living people
Daytime Emmy Award winners
Writers from Los Angeles
American male television writers
Screenwriters from California